Baoding East railway station is a railway station of Beijing–Guangzhou–Shenzhen–Hong Kong high-speed railway located in Baoding, Hebei Province, the People's Republic of China. It opened with the Beijing–Zhengzhou section of the railway on 26 December 2012.

References

Railway stations in Hebei
Railway stations in China opened in 2012